Dog Latin or cod Latin  is a phrase or jargon that imitates Latin, often by "translating" English words (or those of other languages) into Latin by conjugating or declining them as if they were Latin words. Dog Latin is usually a humorous device mocking scholarly seriousness. It can also mean a poor-quality attempt at writing genuine Latin.

History
Examples of this predate even Shakespeare, whose 1590s play, Love's Labour's Lost, includes a reference to dog Latin:

Thomas Jefferson mentioned dog Latin by name in 1815:

Examples
 Illegitimi non carborundum, interpreted as 'Don't let the bastards grind you down'.
 Semper ubi sub ubi is unintelligible as Latin, but translates word for word as 'always where under where', interpreted as 'always wear underwear'.
 A once-common schoolboy doggerel which, though very poor Latin, would have done a tolerable job of reinforcing the rhythms of Latin hexameters:

Insofar as this specimen can be translated, it is as follows:

The meter uses Latin vowel quantities for the Latin parts, and to some extent follows English stress in the English parts.

Another variant has similar lines in a different order:

The meaning here is "The storm rose up and overturned the boat" and "Except for John Periwig", etc.

 Another verse in similar vein, from Geoffrey Willans' Down with Skool, is:

which, when read aloud using traditional English pronunciation of Latin, sounds like the following:

but which means in Latin

 The following spoof of legal Latin, in the fictional case of Daniel v Dishclout (from George Alexander Stevens' "Lecture on Heads", 1765), describes a kitchen:

In English, this is:

 The Red Green Show closes each episode with the recitation of the Possum Lodge motto, Quando omni flunkus moritati - which can be translated as "When all else fails, play dead".
 Finnish death metal band Omnium Gatherum gets its name from 1500s era butchered Latin meaning "a hodgepodge of various things".
 The title of death/folk metal Verbal Deception's debut album Aurum Aetus Piraticus is Dog Latin for "Golden Age of Piracy".
 The songs of Era, a musical project by Eric Lévi, are usually in Latin-sounding gibberish.
 The magazine name Atlas Obscura is not proper Latin.
 A running gag in the series of Looney Tunes cartoons starring Wile E. Coyote and the Road Runner assigns different fake Dog Latin species names in each episode to Wile E. Coyote and the Road Runner. The actual Latin species names for the coyote and road runner were used in a 2003 episode of the series, The Whizzard of Ow.
 The Warhammer 40,000 wargame universe makes frequent use of pseudo-latin (which is referred to in-universe as 'High Gothic') in its product names and background material. This is to protect copyright as much as for artistic reasons, as Games Workshop (the games producers) found they were unable to trademark generic terms such as 'space marine' or 'imperial guard'.

See also

 Latatian, dog Latin in the Discworld novels by Terry Pratchett
 Hiberno-Latin, playful learned Latin literature by Irish monks
 Latino sine Flexione, a constructed language based on Latin, but using only ablative as the standard form
 Law Latin, a form of Latin used in English legal contexts, similarly to Law French
 Lorem ipsum, nonsense filler text based on a Cicero work
 Macaronic language, using a mixture of languages, such as Latin and English
 Medieval Latin, including many influences from vernacular languages
 New Latin, Latin used in the modern world
 Pig Latin, simple verbal code language based on English

References

Latin language
Humour
 
Macaronic language